Michael Obasuyi (born 12 August 1999) is a Belgian hurdler. He competed in the 2020 Summer Olympics. He was born to a Belgian mother and a Nigerian father, both of whom sprinted in their youth.

International competitions

1Disqualified in the final

References

External links
 
 
 

1999 births
Living people
Sportspeople from Ostend
Athletes (track and field) at the 2020 Summer Olympics
Belgian male hurdlers
Olympic athletes of Belgium
Belgian people of Nigerian descent